Anton Reinthaller (14 April 1895 – 6 March 1958) was an Austrian right-wing politician active before and after the Second World War. After a career in Nazi Germany as an SS-Brigadeführer and member of the Nazi Reichstag, he was the inaugural leader of the Freedom Party of Austria (FPÖ).

Early life 

Born in Mettmach, he served in World War I. Reinthaller was taken prisoner of war by Russian Army in 1916 before being exchanged in June 1918. He held the rank of Leutnant der Reserve. Returning to Austria he studied at the Agricultural College and became a forestry engineer in Lilienfeld, Attersee and Haus im Ennstal.

Pre-war political activity 

Politically, Reinthaller initially belonged to the Landbund before switching to support the Nazis in 1928. He rose through the ranks of Austria's Nazi set-up, becoming state peasant leader in 1934, although his moderate stance, particularly with regards to the use of violence, meant that he was often in conflict with Theodor Habicht who feared that Reinthaller was preparing to break away and form a specifically Austrian Nazi movement that would reject union with Germany. However Habicht did not move against Reinthaller, who enjoyed good personal relations with Rudolf Hess and Richard Walther Darré, although ultimately he was removed after he spearheaded his own negotiations with Engelbert Dollfuß.

Although he had no real involvement in the failed Nazi putsch of July 1934 Reinthaller was nonetheless held for a while in Kaisersteinbruch concentration camp where he met and befriended Ernst Kaltenbrunner who, despite his own more radical views, became a supporter of Reinthaller. Reinthaller attempted to negotiate an agreement with Kurt Schuschnigg with a view to the Nazis entering the Vaterländische Front although when this failed he stepped aside from his role as the effective leader of Austria's Nazis in favour of Hermann Neubacher. Reinthaller stepped away from active politics after this, although he remained a voice of dissent on the sidelines, attacking Nazi anti-Semitism on the basis of its negative impact on international opinion of the Nazis, whilst also resisting any move to complete Anschluss.

He would re-emerge in 1935, with the backing of Kaltenbrunner and Franz Langoth, to form a National Front that sought to unite Austria's Sturmabteilung and Schutzstaffel with other rightist groups in the service of the Vaterländische Front. However the radical Nazi leader Josef Leopold stepped in as he felt Reinthaller was diluting the impact of Austria's Nazis too much and had him deprived of his party positions in 1937.

Under Nazism 

Although Reinthaller had lost his positions in the Austrian Nazi Party and had earlier opposed Anschluss, he made something of a political comeback following the Nazi takeover. Becoming a member of the Reichstag he served as Minister for Agriculture in the cabinet of Arthur Seyss-Inquart from 12 March 1938 to 30 April 1939. Following this he was appointed Undersecretary of State to the Reich Ministry of Food and Agriculture under his old friend Darré, and went on to fill a number of positions for the Nazi government, including Gauamtsleiter of the Lower Danube Landvolk, head of the Landesernährungsamt Donauland (regional Food Office) and an honorary Brigadeführer (Major General) in the SS. Having initially joined the SS in December 1938 (with the membership number 292,775) he achieved his highest rank on 30 January 1941.

In April 1938, the Donau-Zeitung reported that Reinthaller took the Austrian Wotan steamer to Passau, where he welcomed German transport minister Julius Dorpmüller to Austria. Two days later, the newspaper stated that Reinthaller was still inspecting facilities along the Danube.

Post-war activism 

Along with Rudolf Neumayer (Finance Minister) and Guido Schmidt (Foreign Minister under Schuschnigg), Reinthaller was brought before the Austrian People's Court and accused of "high treason against the Austrian people", with the three labelled as being those most responsible for the Anschluss. Reinthaller was found guilty of lesser charges and sentenced to three years imprisonment, serving the sentence from 1950 when he was released from American custody.

After the war, Reinthaller became an advocate of the 'Third force' in Austrian politics. On this basis he was chosen to lead the FPÖ when it replaced the Federation of Independents in 1956. Before long Reinthaller once again became an important figure in Austrian politics as, despite his Nazi origins, Julius Raab made a deal with Reinthaller in 1957 that he would ensure that the FPÖ did not nominate a candidate for the Presidency. As a result, Raab was thus nominated as a joint Austrian People's Party-FPÖ candidate. He died in Innviertel in 1958, with the leadership of the FPÖ passing to Friedrich Peter.

References

External links
 

1895 births
1958 deaths
People from Ried im Innkreis District
Austrian Nazis
Freedom Party of Austria politicians
Austro-Hungarian military personnel of World War I
Officials of Nazi Germany
SS-Brigadeführer
Members of the Reichstag of Nazi Germany
Agriculture ministers of Austria
Government ministers of Austria
World War I prisoners of war held by Russia
World War II prisoners of war held by the United States
Austrian prisoners of war
Prisoners and detainees of Austria